A colorimeter is a device used in colorimetry that measures the absorbance of particular wavelengths of light by a specific solution. It is commonly used to determine the concentration of a known solute in a given solution by the application of the Beer–Lambert law, which states that the concentration of a solute is proportional to the absorbance.

Construction

The essential parts of a colorimeter are:
 a light source (often an ordinary low-voltage filament lamp);
 an adjustable aperture;
 a set of colored filters;
 a cuvette to hold the working solution;
 a detector (usually a photoresistor) to measure the transmitted light;
 a meter to display the output from the detector.

In addition, there may be:
 a voltage regulator, to protect the instrument from fluctuations in mains voltage;
 a second light path, cuvette and detector.  This enables comparison between the working solution and a "blank", consisting of pure solvent, to improve accuracy.

There are many commercialized colorimeters as well as open source versions with construction documentation for education and for research.

Filters
Changeable optics filters are used in the colorimeter to select the wavelength which the solute absorbs the most, in order to maximize accuracy. The usual wavelength range is from 400 to 700 nm. If it is necessary to operate in the ultraviolet range then some modifications to the colorimeter are needed. In modern colorimeters the filament lamp and filters may be replaced by several (light-emitting diode) of different colors.

Cuvettes

In a manual colorimeter the cuvettes are inserted and removed by hand. An automated colorimeter (as used in an AutoAnalyzer) is fitted with a flowcell through which solution flows continuously.

Output
The output from a colorimeter may be displayed by an analogue or digital meter and may be shown as transmittance (a linear scale from 0 to 100%) or as absorbance (a logarithmic scale from zero to infinity). The useful range of the absorbance scale is from 0 to 2 but it is desirable to keep within the range 0–1, because above 1 the results become unreliable due to scattering of light.

In addition, the output may be sent to a chart recorder, data logger, or computer.

See also

 Spectronic 20
 Spectrophotometer
 Lovibond Colorimeter

Notes

References
The Nuffield Foundation 2003. March 30, 2003.  
"Colour." Encyclopædia Britannica. Encyclopædia Britannica Online. Encyclopædia Britannica Inc. (2011) Accessed 17 November 2011. 
"Colorimetry" Encyclopædia Britannica. Encyclopædia Britannica Online. Encyclopædia Britannica Inc. (2011) 17 November 2011. 
Orion Colorimetry Theory. The Technical Edge. 

Color
Optical instruments
Spectroscopy
Laboratory equipment